Wells Land District is a land district (cadastral division) of Western Australia, located within the Eastern Land Division of the state. It spans roughly 24°00'S - 26°20'S in latitude and 121°40'E - 123°20'E in longitude. Its name honours Lawrence Allen Wells, an explorer of the area in 1896–1897.

It lies to the north of Lake Carnegie, and part of the Canning Stock Route passes through the north-west of the district.

The district was created on 30 January 1925 and was defined in the Government Gazette:

References

Land districts of Western Australia